The  was one of a series of battles fought in the far north of Japan's main island of Honshū (the Tōhoku region) contemporaneous with the famous and decisive campaigns between Tokugawa Ieyasu and Ishida Mitsunari further south.

Background
Over the course of the year 1600, Naoe Kanetsugu, a general loyal to Ishida Mitsunari, would lead a campaign in Tōhoku, which included the siege of Hasedō castle, near Yamagata, which was his ultimate goal. Hasedō was held by  Mogami Yoshiaki and the castle garrison led by Shimura Takaharu and backed by a Tokugawa-loyal army of the Date clan.

Battle
Twenty thousand of Uesugi's men moved towards Yamagata from the north while Naoe Kanetsugu began his siege on Hasedō. Having received reinforcements of 100 horsemen and 200 arquebusiers, he laid siege to Hasedō for fourteen days before Date Masamune forces arrived to relieve the castle. 
Naoe Kanetsugu decided to head for the front lines, leaving the defense of the Uesugi north garrison to Kagekatsu; 

Date's general Magoichi Saika decided to head for the Kagekatsu's north garrison as Date Masamune army under Rusu Masakage relieved his uncle in Hasedo Castle.
 
Sakenobe Hidetsuna joined Hasedō castle as reinforcement under the order of Mogami Yoshiaki. He started a night attack upon the military camps of the Uesugi clan and damaged them.

Rusu Masakage led the relief force to the castle (Date Masamune sent Rusu Masakage as his representative.) and defeated Uesugi's force led by Suibara Chikanori and Amakasi Kagetsugu as they attempted to penetrate the castle's defenses. 

The castle was finally relieved by Date forces, causing Naoe Kanetsugu to declare an all-out attack on Hasedō. Kasuga Mototada was the vanguard, and charged the castle, but was forced to retreat due to heavy arquebus fire. An army from the castle charged north and then began attacking the retreating Uesugi's forces.

A small besieging force remained, and fighting continued, in which Naoe's general Kamiizumi Yasutsuna was killed. . 

However in November 5, news arrived of Tokugawa Ieyasu's victory at the Battle of Sekigahara, and so Naoe called a full withdrawal of all his forces back to Yonezawa, putting an end to Uesugi's campaigns in the north.

References

Turnbull, Stephen (1998). The Samurai Sourcebook. London: Cassell & Co.

 

Hasedo
1600 in Japan
Conflicts in 1600
Mogami clan
Date clan